The 1904 Michigan gubernatorial election was held on November 1, 1904. Republican nominee Fred M. Warner defeated Democratic candidate Woodbridge N. Ferris with 54.09% of the vote.

General election

Candidates
Major party candidates
Fred M. Warner, Republican
Woodbridge N. Ferris, Democratic
Other candidates
Walter S. Westerman, Prohibition
William E. Walter, Socialist
Shepard B. Cowles, Socialist Labor

Results

References

1904
Michigan
Gubernatorial
November 1904 events